Manubhai Motilal Patel is  an Indian politician. He was a Member of Parliament, representing Gujarat in the Rajya Sabha the upper house of India's Parliament as a member of the Janata Party.

References

Rajya Sabha members from Gujarat
Janata Party politicians
Year of death missing